Aphrissa boisduvalii, the Boisduval's sulphur, is a butterfly in the family Pieridae. It is found from Guatemala to Brazil, Colombia and Bolivia.

References

Coliadinae
Butterflies of Central America
Pieridae of South America
Fauna of the Amazon
Butterflies described in 1861
Taxa named by Baron Cajetan von Felder
Taxa named by Rudolf Felder